Frida Svensson may refer to:

 Frida Svensson (athlete) (born 1970),  Swedish track and field athlete
 Frida Svensson (rower) (born 1981), Swedish sculler
 Frida Svensson (footballer) (born 1989), Swedish football midfielder